Pogonocherus sturanii is a species of beetle in the family Cerambycidae. It was described by Sama and Schurmann in 1982. It is known from Spain.

References

Pogonocherini
Beetles described in 1982